Jamrud Rural District is a rural district (dehestan) in the Central District of Torbat-e Jam County, Razavi Khorasan Province, Iran. At the 2006 census, its population was 9,651, in 2,133 families.  The rural district has 20 villages. One of them is called Toqoz-e Sofla.

References 

Rural Districts of Razavi Khorasan Province
Torbat-e Jam County